dnAnalytics is an open-source numerical library for .NET written in C# and F#. It features functionality similar to BLAS and LAPACK.

Features 
The software library provides facilities for:
 Linear algebra classes with support for sparse matrices and vectors (with a F# friendly interface).
 Dense and sparse solvers.
 Probability distributions.
 Random number generation (including Mersenne Twister MT19937).
 QR, LU, SVD, and Cholesky decomposition classes.
 Matrix IO classes that read and write matrices from/to Matlab, Matrix Market, and delimited files.
 Complex and “special” math routines.
 Descriptive Statistics, Histogram, and Pearson Correlation Coefficient.
 Overload mathematical operators to simplify complex expressions.
 Visual Studio visual debuggers for matrices and vectors
 Runs under Microsoft Windows and platforms that support Mono.
 Optional support for Intel Math Kernel Library (Microsoft Windows and Linux)

See also 
 Math.NET Numerics
 List of numerical libraries
 list of numerical analysis software

Numerical software
Software using the BSD license